Sebastián Decoud was the defending champion, but chose to compete in Pereira instead.Filippo Volandri won in the final 6–4, 7–5, against Lamine Ouahab.

Seeds

Draw

Finals

Top half

Bottom half

References
Qualifying Singles
Main Draw

Rai Open - Singles
2010 Singles